The GF World Cup '11 is the seventh edition of the GF World Cup, which was held in Aarhus, Denmark between 20 and 25 September. Romania entered the tournament as defending champions following their triumph in 2010 against Norway, but were eliminated during the group stage. Norway reached the final again, for the fourth time in row, but fall short in close fight against Russia, which came back from four goals down to win the match 25–23.

Competition

Group A 

All times are Central European Summer Time (UTC+2)

Group B 

All times are Central European Summer Time (UTC+2)

Knockout stage

Semifinals

Bronze medal match

Final

Ranking and awards

Final standing

All Star Team
Goalkeeper: 
Left wing: 
Left back: 
Pivot: 
Centre back: 
Right back: 
Right wing: 
Most Valuable Player: 

Source: Danish Handball Federation

References

External links
 GF World Cup 2011 Site

2011 in handball
2011 in Danish sport
GF World Cup
International handball competitions hosted by Denmark